Saylla District is one of eight districts of the province Cusco in Peru.

See also 
 Pachatusan
 Waqutu
 Waypun

References